The women's 100 metres at the 2019 World Athletics Championships was held at the Khalifa International Stadium in Doha, Qatar, on 28 to 29 September 2019.

Summary
This was the first major championships for Shelly-Ann Fraser-Pryce after giving birth and the maternity leave in 2017. Here, against the Olympic Champion Elaine Thompson and the defending champion Tori Bowie, Fraser-Pryce dominated the heats and the semi-finals. In the final, she took the lead on the first step and pulled away to a dominating victory in a world-leading time of 10.71.  While Marie-Josée Ta Lou was the next fastest out of the blocks, Dina Asher-Smith closed quickly to overtake Ta Lou for a clear silver medal, leaving the defending silver medalist with the bronze.

For 32-year-old Fraser-Pryce, it was only .01 off of her personal best and Marion Jones' Championship record, and one of the fastest times in history.  Asher-Smith's 10.83 was the British national record.

Records
Before the competition records were as follows:

The following records were set at the competition:

Schedule
The event schedule, in local time (UTC+3), was as follows:

Results

Heats
The first 3 in each heat ( Q ) and the next six fastest ( q ) qualified for the semifinals. The overall results were as follows:

Semi-finals

The first two in each heat (Q) and the next two fastest (q) qualify for the final.

Final
The final was started on 29 September at 23:20.

References

100
100 metres at the World Athletics Championships